Hanotiya is a Town or Panchayat of Chhindwara district in the Indian state of Madhya Pradesh, India. It is located at 48 km in West from District headquarter and 7 km in South from Junnardeo City headquarter.

Educational Institutions

 Government Higher Secondary School, Hanotiya, District - Chhindwara

Demographics

According to the 2011 census Hanotiya Village has a population of 1350.

Geography

Attractions

 Hanotiya Madai Mela
 Raini Dham (7days fair)
 Takia River

See also
 Chhindwara district
 Junnardeo

References

Cities and towns in Chhindwara district